Ghost9 (고스트나인) is a South Korean boy band formed by Maroo Entertainment in 2020. They made their debut on September 23, 2020, with their debut EP Pre Episode 1: Door.

History

Pre-debut
Before debut, Choi Jun-seong, Lee Tae-seung, Lee Woo-jin, and Lee Jin-woo participated in Produce X 101. Lee Jin-woo finished in 22nd place, Lee Woo-jin in 41st, Choi Jun-seong in 46th, and Lee Tae-seung in 53rd. Lee Tae-seung, Lee Woo-jin, and Lee Jin-woo also made their debut as members of Teen Teen. Hwang Dong-jun and Son Jun-hyung participated in Mix Nine, only the latter passed the audition.

2020: Debut with Pre Episode 1: Door, Pre Episode 2: W.all 
Ghost9 debuted with their debut EP Pre Episode 1: Door on September 23, with the lead single "Think of Dawn".

On November 25, 2020, Maroo announced that the group's second mini album, Pre Episode 2: W.all on December 10, with the lead single "W.all".

2021: Now : Where We Are, Here & Now : When We Are In Love, Hwang Dong Jun and Lee Tae Seung's departure, Now : Who We Are Facing 
On February 17, Maroo Entertainment announced GHOST9 would make a comeback on March 11, with the release of their third mini album, Now: Where We Are, Here on March 11, with the lead single "Seoul".

On May 12, Maroo announced that the group would make a comeback on June 3, with their fourth mini album, Now: When We Are in Love on June 3, with the lead single "Up All Night".

On September 5, it was announced that members Hwang Dong-jun and Lee Tae-seung would be departing from Ghost9 and the group will continue as seven without the addition of new members.

On November 9, Maroo announced that the group would make their first comeback as seven on November 25, with their fifth mini album, Who We Are Facing on November 25, with the lead single "Control".

2022: US Tour and Arcade: V 
On January 15, 2022, they held the first concert of their tour GHOST9 [Into The Now] Meet&Live Tour in US in Los Angeles. On January 18, they then performed a free busking show in Venice Beach, Calif. The next day, they held a fansign event in San Francisco, at the local Kpop store SarangHello. They then held their second concert on January 20 in San Francisco.

Ghost9 released their sixth EP Arcade: V on April 7, with the lead single "X-Ray".

2023: Joining Peak Time

Members
Son Jun-hyung (손준형)
Lee Shin (이신)
Lee Kang-sung (이강성)
Choi Jun-seong (최준성)
Prince (프린스)
Lee Woo-jin (이우진)
Lee Jin-woo (이진우)

Discography

Extended plays

Singles

Music videos

Awards and nominations

References

K-pop music groups
South Korean boy bands
South Korean dance music groups
Musical groups from Seoul
Musical groups established in 2019
2019 establishments in South Korea
South Korean pop music groups
Peak Time contestants